David Michael Green (born 28 February 1960 in Brisbane, Queensland) is an Australian equestrian and Olympic champion. He won a team gold medal in eventing at the 1992 Summer Olympics in Barcelona.

References

External links

1960 births
Living people
Olympic equestrians of Australia
Australian male equestrians
Olympic gold medalists for Australia
Australian event riders
Sportspeople from Brisbane
Olympic medalists in equestrian
Equestrians at the 1988 Summer Olympics
Equestrians at the 1992 Summer Olympics
Equestrians at the 1996 Summer Olympics
Medalists at the 1992 Summer Olympics
20th-century Australian people